This is a list of alumni of the University of York, listed in alphabetical order by surname. The University of York, founded in 1963, has among its alumni many who have become notable, including at least fifteen Members of the United Kingdom Parliament, five members of the House of Lords, two Members of the Scottish Parliament, one Member of the European Parliament and several ministers of non-UK governments. The university is also represented by alumni educated in the liberal arts such as English literature, social sciences, economics, philosophy, medieval history, and music. More recently, due to expansion into areas of technology, it has also produced notable computer scientists.

A

 Lama Abu-Odeh, Palestinian American academic: MA, philosophy, 1989
 Daron Acemoglu , Turkish-born American economist, Professor at MIT: BA, Economics, 1989
 Edward Acton, historian and former Vice-Chancellor of the University of East Anglia : BA, History, 1971
 Mark Addis, philosopher: MSc, Computing
 Haleh Afshar, Baroness Afshar, cross-bench peer: BA, Politics, ?
 Geoffrey Álvarez , composer: D Phil, Composition
 Moniza Alvi , poet: BA, English
 Fleur Anderson, Labour MP for Putney: BSc, Politics, 1993; president of the Students Union, 1993–1994
 Kerry Andrew, composer and singer (Juice): BA, music, MA & PhD, composition
 Rollo Armstrong, musician (Faithless): BA, Philosophy & English, 1988
 Mohammad Hanif Atmar, Interior Minister of Afghanistan: Diploma Information Technology & MA Politics, 1997

B
 Ian Bailey, author: BA, English/Anglo-Saxon, 1980
 Kevin Bailey, poet: BSc, Psychology, 1986
 Sally Baldwin, academic: Dip. Social Administration, & DPhil 1976?
 Tony Banks, Baron Stratford, MP: BA Politics, 1967
Andrea Barber, actress
 Hugh Bayley, MP: BPhil, South African Studies, 1977
 Helen Bell, composer and musician: BA Music, 2001
 Steve Beresford, musician: BA music, 1970
 Denys Blakeway, television producer and author 
 Mark William Bolland, journalist and publicist: BSc Chemistry 1987
 Anne Boyd, composer and professor of music: DPhil composition, 1972
 Keith Bradley, Baron Bradley, politician: MPhil Social Administration, 1979
 Stephen Brewster, professor of computer science: DPhil human-computer interaction, 1994
 Carole Bromley, poet
 Andrew Brons, MEP and former National Front leader: BA Politics, 1970
 Michael Brown, former MP and journalist
Scott Bryan, TV critic and broadcaster: BA Politics, 2010
 Richard Burden, MP: BA politics 1978
 Charles Butler, author: MSc Information Processing, 1989, DPhil English 1989
 Tanya Byron, child psychologist, author, TV presenter and Chancellor of Edge Hill University: BA Psychology, 1989

C

 James Callis, actor: BA English and Related Literature, 1993
 Matt Carter, General Secretary of the Labour Party: DPhil Politics, 1999
 Richard Causton, composer: BMus 1993, MA Composition 1994
 Aníbal Cavaco Silva, 11th Prime Minister and 21st President of Portugal: PhD Economics, 1973
 Horatio Clare, writer, radio producer and journalist: BA English & Related Literature, 1996
 Jane Clarke, Professor of Molecular Biophysics, University of Cambridge
 Myrna Combellack, writer, translator and academic: DPhil, English Literature, 1971
David Conn, journalist and author: BA English literature & politics, 1986
 Richard Coyle, actor: BA Politics, 1994
 Megan Crane, novelist: MA English Literature 1999, DPhil 2004
 Tim Crane, Knightbridge Professor of Philosophy, University of Cambridge: MA Philosophy, 1985
 Lee Cronin, chemist, nano-scientist: BSc Chemistry, 1994 & PhD, 1997

D
 Ken Dark, archaeologist: BA Archaeology, 1982?
Sara Davies MBE, entrepreneur: Management, 2006
 Caroline Dean, plant scientist; group leader at the John Innes Centre: BA Biology, 1978 & DPhil, 1982
Simon Ditchfield FRHistS, Professor of Early Modern History: BA History, 1980
 Michael Dixon, director of the Natural History Museum: DPhil Zoology
 Chris d'Lacey, children's author: BSc biology, 1975?
 Michael Dobbs, US-based author: BA Economic & Social History, 1972
 Paul Dolan, behavioural scientist: MSc and D.Phil. economics, 1991 and 1997
 Michelle Donelan, MP and Secretary of State for Digital, Culture, Media and Sport: BA History and Politics.
 Juraj Draxler, Education minister of Slovakia 2014-2016:MA Politics, 2005 
 Duncan Druce, musician: MA music, 1985
 Helen Dunmore, writer: BA English, 1973
 Christopher Dye, epidemiologist, former Gresham Professor of Physic: Biology
 Greg Dyke, Head of the Football Association and BFI; former Director General of the BBC: BA politics, 1974

E

 Iain R. Edgar, social anthropologist: BA Philosophy, 1969
 Huw Edwards, MP for Monmouth
 Louise Ellman, MP for Liverpool Riverside: MPhil Social Administration, 1972
 Bryan Elsley, scriptwriter and creator of Skins: BA English & History, 1982
 Stephen Emmott, computer scientist: BSc Experimental Psychology, 1987
 Clive Emsley, historian and criminologist: BA History, 1966
 Harry Enfield, comedian: BA Politics, 1982

F
 Jane Ferguson, journalist
 Steve Foots, Chief Executive of Croda International, BSc Chemistry 
 Jay Foreman, musical comedian
 Christopher Fox, composer: DPhil composition, 1984
 Sir Lawrence Freedman, historian and political adviser, Professor of War Studies at King's College London: BPhil 
 Ashley Ford-McAllister, BA English and Literature, 2007

G
 Sean Gabb, libertarian academic: BA History, 1981
 David Gauntlett, sociologist: BA Sociology, 1992
 Sarah Gavron, film director: BA English, 1992
 Helen Geake, archaeologist: DPhil Archaeology, 1991?
 Roberta Gilchrist, archaeologist: DPhil Archaeology, 1989?
Maurice Glasman, Baron Glasman, academic: MA Political Philosophy 
 John Godfrey, composer: BA Music, 1983 & DPhil Composition, 1989
 Jeremy Goldberg, historian: MA History
 Paul Goodman, MP: BA English Literature, 1981
 Peter Gordon, radio presenter
 David Graddol, linguist: BA Language/Linguistics, 1975 & Sociology, 1983
 Linda Grant, novelist and journalist: BA, English, 1975
 Michael Gray, author, authority on Bob Dylan: BA History and English Literature, 1967
 Jane Grenville, archaeologist and academic: PhD by publications, 2005
 Susanna Gross, journalist and newspaper editor
William Owen "Will" Gregory, musician and producer

H

 Emily Hall, composer: BMus, 1999?
 Christine Hamilton, television personality: BA Sociology, 1971?
 Fabian Hamilton, MP: BA Social Sciences
 Han Seung-soo, 39th Prime Minister of South Korea: DPhil Economics, 1968
 Andrew Harman, science fiction and fantasy author, game designer, co-creator of YAY Games : BSc Biochemistry
 Harriet Harman, MP, solicitor, Former Deputy Leader of the Labour Party: BA Politics, 1972
 Richard Harpin, businessman: Economics, 1986
 Patrick Harrex, musician: Music, 1968
 Tim Harries, bass player: BA Music, 1981
 Jonty Harrison, composer: DPhil Composition, 1980
 Adam Hart-Davis, television producer and presenter: DPhil Chemistry, 1969
 Sue Hartley, Professor of Ecology: DPhil, Ecology
 Joan Higgins, DBE, Professor of Health Policy: BA Social Administration, 1971
 Jimmy Hill, radio, television, and YouTube personality: BA History, 2009
 Jane Hillston, mathematician: BA Mathematics, 1985
 Robert Hingley, musician: BA Linguistics, 1978
 Peter Hitchens, journalist: BA Philosophy and Politics, 1973
 Patrick Holford, nutrition expert: BSc Psychology, 1976
 Martha Holmes, broadcaster: PhD Marine biology, 1988
 Paul Holmes, MP: BA History, 1978
 Sungji Hong, composer: PhD, musical composition, 2003
 Anthony Horowitz, author and screenwriter (Foyle's War): BA English, 1977

J
 Stevi Jackson, professor of women's studies, University of York: BA Sociology 1973
 Lawrence James, author and journalist: BA English and History, 1966
 Aled Gruffydd Jones, historian, Sir John Williams Professor of Welsh History at Aberystwyth University: BA History, 1977
 Trevor Jones, composer: BA Music, 1977 & MA Composition 1978
 Jung Chang, writer and historian: PhD linguistics, 1982

K
Thomas Kariuki, biologist and Director of Programmes at the African Academy of Sciences : PhD, Immunology, 2004
Brian Kennedy, journalist and LGBT rights activist : DPhil Biochemistry, 1974
 Ranjana Khanna, literary critic : BA English & Related Literature, 1988, DPhil 1993
 Oona King, Baroness King of Bow, former MP: BA Politics, 1990
Matt Kilcoyne, Deputy Director of the Adam Smith Institute: PPE, 2013
 Karina Kirkina, more in Real Analysis
 Panayiotis Kokoras, composer : MA, PhD, musical composition

L
 Mark Laity, NATO spokesman, former BBC news reporter: BA, MA, 1977, 1978
 Philip Lawson, composer, singer (The King's Singers): BA, Music, 1979
 Clive Lawton, Founder of Limmud
 J. L. (Joanna) Laynesmith, historian: BA English/History, 1993 & DPhil Mediaeval History, 2000
 Ruth Lea, Baroness Lea of Lymm, economist: Economics and Statistics, 1969
 Carol Leader, actor: BA History 1971
Phil Lester, YouTube vlogger and BBC Radio 1 DJ: BA English Language and Linguistics, 2008 & MA Postproduction with Visual Effects, 2009
 Victor Lewis-Smith, comedian and writer
 Marina Lewycka, author: BPhil English Literature, 1970
 Tim Liardet, poet: BA History
 Chris Lilley, computer scientist: MSc Biological Computing, 1990
 Peter Lord, Oscar-nominated director of Aardman Animations: BA, English, 1976
 Emma Lowndes, actress: BA English, 1997?
 Zoe Lyons, comedian: Psychology, 1992

M
 Phil Mac Giolla Bhain, journalist: BA Politics and Sociology
Kevin Maguire, journalist: BA Politics
 Elleck Mashingaidze, Zimbabwean historian and diplomat: PhD
Harriet Mathews CMG OBE, British diplomat: BA History, 1996
 Genista McIntosh, Baroness McIntosh of Hudnall, Labour Life Peer and theatre executive
 Grace McCleen, novelist: MA English Literature
 Stephen McNair, BA English 1967. Professor of Education (Emeritus) University of Surrey 
 Des McNulty, politician and MSP: BA, Social science, 1974
 Gordon McPherson, composer: BA Music, 1986 & DPhil 1991
 Molly Meacher, Baroness Meacher: BA Economics, 1970
 Paul Mealor, composer: Music, 2002
 Farah Mendlesohn, writer and academic: DPhil History, 1997
 Anna Meredith, composer: Music
 Richard Middleton, musicologist: PhD Music
 Eduardo Reck Miranda, composer: MSc Music Technology, 1992
 Kathryn Mitchell, psychologist: Psychology
 Mahmoud Mohieldin, economist: MSc Economic & Social Policy Analysis, 1990
 Nicola Monaghan, novelist: BSc Mathematics, 1992
 Dominic Muldowney, composer: 1976
 Greg Mulholland, MP: BA, Politics, 1991 & MA Public Administration Policy, 1995
 Gráinne Mulvey, composer; Professor of Composition, Technological University of Dublin: DPhil in Music Composition, 1999
 Meg Munn, MP: BA, Language & Linguistics, 1981

N
 Beverley Naidoo, South African children's writer : BA Education, 1968
 Ratish Nanda, Indian conservation architect : MA in Conservation Studies, 1998 
 Glen Newey, academic and political philosopher : MA & DPhil Philosophy
 Michele Newman, television presenter : BA Economics, 1977
 Rebecca Newman, singer, songwriter: BA Philosophy, Politics and Economics, 2007

O
 Rosemary O'Day (née Margaret Rosemary Brookes, now Englander), historian and author: BA History, 1967
 Denise O'Donoghue, television executive: BA Politics, 1979
 Waheed Omer, chief spokesperson for the President of Afghanistan: MA Political Science
 Albert Owen, MP: BA Politics, 1997

P
 Alvin Pang, poet: BA, English, 1994
 Lance Parkin, writer: BA English, 1994; MA English, 1995
 Joseph Pivato, academic & writer: BA English & French, 1970, PhD 1977 (Alberta) Prof. Athabasca University.
 Babita Pohoomull, actress: BA Education, 2003
 Linda Porter, historian: BA History 1968 & DPhil 1973
 Anthony Powers, composer: DPhil Composition, 1976
 Harvey Proctor, MP 1979–1987: BA History
 Geoffrey K. Pullum, Professor of Linguistics: BA Language, 1972

R
Janina Ramirez, historian and TV presenter: PhD Art/Literature, 2006
 Sigrid Rausing, anthropologist and publisher: BA History, 1986
 Spencer Reece, American poet: MA English Literature
 John Richards, musician: DPhil Composition, 2002
 Steve Richards, television presenter and journalist: BA History, 1981
 Leen Ritmeyer, archaeologist: MA Conservation Studies
 Peter Robinson, poet: BA English, 1974
 Justina Robson, science fiction author : BA Philosophy and Linguistics
 Malcolm Rose, author: DPhil Chemistry
 Mark Russell, composer and radio presenter : BMus Music, 1982
 Leon Rubin, international theatre director, professor

S
Sinan Savaskan, composer ; PhD Music, 1997 *
 David Sawer, composer : BMus Music, 1982
 Severin Schwan, CEO of Hoffman-La Roche : Economics
Tom Scott, YouTuber, presenter, web developer : Linguistics, English language, MA educational studies, 2009?
 Verity Sharp, Radio 3 and The Culture Show presenter : Music, 1992
 Neil Shephard, FBA, economist, Frank B. Baird, Jr Professor of Science, Harvard University: BA Economics/and Statistics, 1986
 Elizabeth Shields, MP for Ryedale : MA Medieval Studies
 Thomas Simaku, composer : DPhil 1996
 Jeanne Siméon, current  Minister of Habitat, Lands, Infrastructure, and Land Transport in the Seychelles
 John Simpson, lexicographer, Chief Editor, Oxford English Dictionary 1993–2013 : BA English, 1975
 Rose Simpson, musician of the Incredible String Band : BA English, 1968
 Lindiwe Sisulu, South African politician : MA History & MPhil, 1989
 Beverley Skeggs, professor of sociology
 Jonathan Slater, Permanent Secretary, Department for Education
 Denis Smalley, composer : DPhil Composition, ?
 Chloe Smith, MP and Secretary of State for Work and Pensions: BA English, 2004?
 Brian Stableford, science fiction writer : BSc Biology, 1969, DPhil (not completed)
 William Graham Stanton, author : BA English & Related Literature, 1995
 Chris Steele-Perkins, photographer : Chemistry, 1966
 Simon Stephens, playwright : BA History, 1992
 Robert David Stevens, computer scientist : MSc Bioinformatics 1991 & DPhil 1996
 Rebecca Stott, novelist : BA English/Art History, 1986
 Jonathan Stroud, author : BA English Literature, 1992
 Graham Swift, Booker Prize-winning author : DPhil 1973?

T

 Jeremy Tambling, British writer and critic
 Ellie Taylor, comedian and television presenter
 Nelson Teich, oncologist and Brazil's Minister of Health
 Caroline Thomson, former chief operating officer of the BBC : BA Economics and History
 Ceiri Torjussen, composer : BA Composition

V
 Phil Venables, computer scientist and member of the President's Council of Advisors on Science and Technology (PCAST)
Vincenzo Visco, Italian economist and politician : MSc Economics, 1969

W

 Sally Wainwright, playwright and television writer : BA English Literature and Creative Writing
 Joe Walker (film editor), Film Editor : BA Music, 1984
 Michael Wall, playwright : BA English, 1976
 Nicholas Wapshott, journalist and writer : BA Politics/Sociology, 1973
Nicholas Watt, journalist: BA History, 1989
 Adrian Weale, author and journalist : BA History, 1985
 Andrew Webster, sociologist : DPhil Sociology, 1981
 Martin Wesley-Smith, composer : DPhil 1974
 Alex Wilson, musician : BEng Electronic & Computer Engineering, 1993
 Trevor Wishart, composer : DPhil Composition, 1973
 John Witherow, newspaper editor (Sunday Times) : BA History, 1975
 Gavin Wood, co-founder of Ethereum : MEng, 2002 & PhD, 2005
 Tony Worthington, MP
 Tim Wright, musician : PhD, 2013

Y
 Steven Yearley, sociologist : PhD Sociology, 1981
 Yeung Sum, politician and former member of the Legislative Council of Hong Kong : MA Social Policy & Administration
 Sir Colville Norbert Young, Governor-General of Belize : DPhil Linguistics, 1973
 Michael Young, businessman and campaigner against apartheid : BA PPE, 1972

References

External links
 Yorkspace - The University of York Alumni Association

Alumni of the University of York
York